Arangeh is a village in Adaran Rural District, Asara District, Karaj County, Alborz Province, Iran.  Arangeh is located in the Alborz Mountain range north of Karaj on the 18th Kilometers of Chalus road. It includes five villages: Arangeh Bozorg (Persian:ارنگه بزرگ), Abahrak (Persian:ابهرک), Sijan (Persian:سیجان), Sar-Ziarat (Persian:سرزیارت), Jay (Persian:جی), Charan (Persian:چاران), Gurab/Jurab (Persian:گوراب) and Khor (Persian:خور). The whole area is called Arangeh and the central and primary village of this area at is Arangeh Bozorg.

At the 2006 census, its population was 136, in 46 families. At the 2011 census, its population was 302, in 100 families.

The village is notable for being the historical residence of the Iranian political dissident Ali Tehrani and the Khazeni Family, who were wealthy landowners during the Qajar dynasty.

References 

Populated places in Karaj County